María Josefa Carmela of Spain (6 July 1744 – 8 December 1801) was a Princess of Naples and Sicily by birth. At the accession of her father to the Spanish throne as Charles III, she became an Infanta of Spain. Born and raised in Naples, she arrived in Spain with her family in October 1759, at age fifteen. She lived at the court of her father and later with her brother Charles IV of Spain. She remained unmarried.

Life

Princess María Josefa of Naples and Sicily was born in Gaeta, Naples. She received the name of her maternal grandmother, Maria Josepha of Austria. Her father had been King of Naples and Sicily as part of a personal union since 1734. Her parents married in 1738 and Maria Josefa was their first daughter to survive over the age of 5. Her parents' fourth child, at the time of her birth she had an older sister María Isabel Ana (1743–1749).

Her younger sister Infanta María Luisa was chosen over María Josefa (1764) to marry the then Grand Duke of Tuscany, son of Maria Theresa.

As a princess of Naples and Sicily, she was an Infanta of Spain through her father. This entitled Maria Josefa to the style of Royal Highness. Her parents were a devoted couple; her mother Maria Amalia of Saxony died barely a year after the family's arrival to Spain. Her father himself died in 1788. Afterwards, Maria Josefa lived at a court dominated by her sister-in-law, Maria Luisa of Parma, a granddaughter of Louis XV of France with whom she did not get along. 

Maria Josefa was a candidate for marrying the widower Louis XV, his wife Marie Leszczyńska dying in 1768 when Maria Josefa was just 24. Louis rejected the idea being offended at her young age. Maria Josefa remained unmarried. After the death of her father, she continued living in the Royal Palace with her brother Charles IV. She supported the Carmelitas nuns, in whose convent of Saint Teresa she arranged to be buried.

She died at the Royal Palace of Madrid aged 57, before her brother Charles IV lost the throne and was exiled in 1808. In 1877 her body was transferred to El Escorial.

Ancestry

Notes

References 
 Mississippi Commission for International Cultural Exchange. The Majesty of Spain: Royal Collections from The Museo del Prado & The Patrimonio Nacional. Mississippi Commission for International Cultural Exchange Inc, 2001.

External link

1744 births
1801 deaths
Spanish infantas
House of Bourbon (Spain)
Neapolitan princesses
Sicilian princesses
Spanish royalty
Burials in the Pantheon of Infantes at El Escorial
18th-century Spanish people
19th-century Spanish people